The 1998 WNBA season was the second season for the Phoenix Mercury. The Mercury reached their first WNBA Finals, but championship hopes were denied when they lost to the Houston Comets in three games.

Offseason
Tara Williams was picked up by the Detroit Shock in the 1998 WNBA Expansion Draft.

WNBA Draft

Regular season

Season standings

Season schedule

Playoffs

Player stats

References

External links
Mercury on Basketball Reference

Phoenix Mercury seasons
Phoenix
Phoenix Mercury